Danai Udomchoke was the defending champion but lost to Tatsuma Ito in the quarterfinals.  Somdev Devvarman defeated Denis Istomin in the final 6–1, 6–2.

Schedule
All times are China Standard Time (UTC+08:00)

Results

Finals

Top half

Section 1

Section 2

Bottom half

Section 3

Section 4

External links
Main Draw

Tennis at the 2010 Asian Games